Maiherperi was an ancient Egyptian noble of Nubian origin buried in tomb KV36 in the Valley of the Kings. He probably lived during the rule of Thutmose IV, and received the honour of a burial in the royal necropolis. His name can be translated as Lion of the Battlefield. Amongst his titles were Child of the Nursery and Fan-bearer on the Right Side of the King. There is speculation that the first title signified that he grew up in the royal nursery as a prince of a vassal territory, or perhaps was the son of a lesser wife or concubine of the pharaoh. He was among the first during the New Kingdom to hold the second title, and was literally true in that he was by the pharaoh's side, likely as an advisor or bodyguard. This same title was also used to denote the Viceroys of Kush later in the New Kingdom.

Tomb of Maiherpri

Maiherperi's copy of the Book of the Dead, which, in the eyes of O'Connor and Cline is "[c]ertainly the most famous and arguably the most beautiful" Book of the Dead depicts him with literally "blackish" skin, leading scholars to believe he was an Egyptian of Nubian descent.

His mummy was unwrapped by Georges Daressy in March 1901, revealing a mummy whose dark skin matched that depicted on his copy of the Book of the Dead, and thought that this was likely Maiherperi's natural colour, unchanged by the mummification process. He also had tightly curled, woolly hair, which turned out to be a wig that had been glued to his scalp.

Bibliography
 Michael Rice, Who's Who in Ancient Egypt By Michael Rice, Routledge 2001, p. 104
David B. O'Connor, Eric H. Cline, Amenhotep III: Perspectives on His Reign, University of Michigan Press 1998,

Footnotes and references

External links
The Tomb of Maihirpre - Pictures of the artifacts from Maiherpri's tomb
Maiherpra
Hatshepsut: from Queen to Pharaoh, an exhibition catalog from The Metropolitan Museum of Art (fully available online as PDF), which contains material on Maiherpri (see index)

Officials of the Eighteenth Dynasty of Egypt
Ancient Egyptian mummies
Fan-bearer on the Right Side of the King